Jonathan Brian Denis,  (born September 22, 1975) is a Canadian politician and lawyer. On May 9, 2012, he was named Solicitor General, Attorney General, and Minister of Justice for the province of Alberta.  He represented the constituency of Calgary-Acadia (formerly Calgary-Egmont) as a Progressive Conservative in the Legislative Assembly of Alberta from 2008 until 2015.

He was first elected in the 2008 provincial election and was appointed to cabinet in January 2010, making him the second youngest person to be named to cabinet in Alberta history.  Denis was re-elected to the newly named constituency of Calgary-Acadia on April 23, 2012.

Early life and education

Jonathan Denis is the son of a soldier in the Canadian forces.  He graduated in 1993 from Luther College, a private school in Regina, SK.  He received a commerce degree from the University of Regina in 1997 and a law degree from the University of Saskatchewan in Saskatoon in 2000.  While in law school, Denis was invited as a speaker at an international law conference in Montreal, Quebec.  In 2018, Denis completed his ICD.D designation with the Institute of Corporate Directors, a program from Rotman School of Business at the University of Toronto.

Career pre-politics (2000-2008)

For approximately two months in 1996, Denis was a staffer for Lynda Haverstock when she was an Independent MLA in the Saskatchewan Legislative Assembly. Haverstock had previously been leader of the Saskatchewan Liberal Party.

Prior to becoming an MLA, Denis was a senior associate, specializing in government relations, at Miller Thomson LLP, a major Canadian law firm.  He was also the co-founder and President of 3D Contact Inc., the other founder being Nepean-Carleton MP Pierre Poilievre  Listed contacts of 3D Contact Inc. are Stephen Harper, Stockwell Day, and Ted Morton. He was also the founder of a successful real estate investment firm named Liberty West Properties Inc.  Denis resigned from both positions after being elected.

Member of the Legislative Assembly of Alberta

2008 Election, private MLA (2008-2010)

Denis sought public office for the Alberta Progressive Conservatives in the 2008 provincial election in the constituency of Calgary-Egmont where he received 43.6% of the vote, beating former Calgary School Board chair Cathie Williams.

Denis initially served as a member of the Standing Committee on the Alberta Heritage Savings Trust Fund, the Public Accounts Committee, the Standing Committee on Health, and the Cabinet Policy Committee on Health.[12]  In 2008, Deputy Premier Ron Stevens also appointed Denis to the Alberta/Alaska Bilateral Council.

In 2008, Health and Wellness Minister Ron Liepert asked Denis to conduct a widely based consultation for the Alberta Pharmaceutical Strategy.  Denis's report came up with ten key recommendations for changes to pharmaceutical policy for the Alberta government.

Also in 2008, Sustainable Resources Minister Ted Morton appointed Denis to the Land Use Framework Committee

On September 16, 2009, Denis was named the Parliamentary Assistant for Energy.

As a lawyer since 2001, Denis introduced the new Alberta Rules of Court as Bill 31, 2009.  This bill provided sweeping reforms to court process and completely new rules of court and procedure for Alberta.

Minister of Housing and Urban Affairs (2010-2011)
Denis was sworn in as Minister of Housing and Urban Affairs as well as Deputy Government House Leader on January 15, 2010,.

On April 6, 2011, Denis provided $638,000.00 in provincial housing money to support tenants of the YWCA's Ophelia House in Calgary.  Ophelia House supports women experiencing homelessness.

In 2011, the Canadian Taxpayers Federation wrote an article praising Denis for reducing spending in his department by 39% while still achieving targets.

Solicitor General & Minister of Public Security (2011-2012), 2012 Election
On October 12, 2011, Denis was sworn in as Solicitor General and Minister of Public Security. He was re-elected in the newly named riding of Calgary-Acadia on April 23, 2012.

Minister of Justice, Attorney General, & Solicitor General (2012-2015), 2015 Election

Denis was named Minister of Justice, Solicitor General, Attorney General, and Provincial Secretary Alberta on May 9, 2012.

Denis has pursued a "law and order" policy on crime, increasing the amount of RCMP in rural areas and a provincial grant for 300 new police officers in the cities.

On September 1, 2012, Denis enacted strict penalties on drunk drivers. Following this drunk driving law, drunk driving charges went down two years in a row, including 17% in 2015.

On April 17, 2014, Denis supported removing the previous preamble to the Marriage Act which made the Act gender-neutral, respecting the LGBTQ community and same-sex marriage.

On June 13, 2014, Denis provided a grant from the Civil Forfeiture Fund to the Edmonton Pride Centre. The grant was used to support programs for LGBTQ youth.

On July 21, 2014, Denis doubled the limit in Alberta small claims court to $50,000.00, which allows "self-represented litigants to avoid more complicated civil proceedings in Court of Queen’s Bench."  This move was lauded by many Alberta lawyers as a positive step for access to justice.

Denis was re-appointed to his previous positions by new Premier Jim Prentice on September 15, 2014. Prentice subsequently appointed Denis Government House Leader.

On September 24, 2014, Denis attended the YWCA's 9th annual "Walk a Mile in her Shoes" to raise funds and awareness toward ending domestic abuse.

Denis resigned on April 25, 2015, during the 2015 election campaign, due to "legal proceedings" between himself and his estranged wife, Breanna Palmer. On May 4, 2015, Court of Queen's Bench Justice Craig Jones cleared Denis's name and "revoked" the order that his wife had obtained against him, stating that Palmer's "recollection of the events was inaccurate". Denis continued as a candidate but was defeated in the May 5, 2015 general election, finishing third in a close three-way race. In February 2019, Justice Jones of the Alberta Court of Queen's Bench found that Palmer had "lied to the court" with a goal of getting Denis to pay her $1 million, and that there was no evidence Denis had ever abused Palmer.

Earlier in the campaign, Denis denied vandalizing his own campaign signs so that they'd read "Jonathan Penis" as a way of getting attention.

Accolades

In 2009, Denis was appointed Queen's Counsel of Alberta.  This is a designation given to lawyers who have exhibited "outstanding contributions to the legal profession or in public life".

Denis was also named as one of Avenue Magazine's "Top 40 under 40" in 2010, which the magazine describes as "an annual selection of the brightest and most active leaders under the age of 40".

In 2011, the Canadian Taxpayers' Federation wrote an article praising Denis for reducing spending in his department by 39% while still achieving targets.  The Canadian Taxpayers' Federation has also twice given Denis a "nice" award for having the best expenses in the entire Alberta government, calling his expenses "boring".

Post-political career 
After leaving politics, Denis became a lawyer for Guardian Law Group in Calgary. In June 2021, Denis represented Edmonton city councillor and mayoral candidate Mike Nickel during a hearing regarding Nickel's personal conduct and use of emails obtained as a councillor for campaign purposes.

While no longer named in the lawsuit arising from former Alberta chief medical examiner Dr. Anny Sauvageau's allegations of wrongful dismissal, lawyers at Denis' firm Guardian Law Group  representing Denis have threatened future legal action against Dr. Sauvageau on the basis of defamation for testimony she is delivering in court. Court of Queen's Bench Justice Doreen Sulyma, presiding over the trial, noted that this letter was "unprecedented" in her experience  and the timing of the letter as "disastrous". Sulyma found Denis in contempt of court, finding he did intend to intimidate Sauvageau and obstruct justice.

In September 2022 Jonathan Denis apologized for a series of videos where he performed a crude negative caricature of indigenous people referencing casinos and alcoholism; in his apology, Denis claimed he did not remember making the videos, potentially because of his own alcohol use.

Election results

References

1976 births
Living people
Canadian people of German descent
Canadian King's Counsel
Lawyers in Alberta
Lawyers in Saskatchewan
Members of the Executive Council of Alberta
Politicians from Calgary
Politicians from Regina, Saskatchewan
Progressive Conservative Association of Alberta MLAs
University of Regina alumni
University of Saskatchewan College of Law alumni
21st-century Canadian politicians